Geholaspis is a genus of mites in the family Macrochelidae. There are about 18 described species in Geholaspis.

Species
These 18 species belong to the genus Geholaspis:

 Geholaspis aeneus Kraus, 1970
 Geholaspis alpinus (Berlese, 1887)
 Geholaspis asper (Berlese, 1904)
 Geholaspis berlesei Valle, 1953
 Geholaspis biperforatus Krauss, 1970
 Geholaspis bulgaricus Balogh, 1958
 Geholaspis comelicensis Lombardini, 1962
 Geholaspis foroliviensis Lombardini, 1943
 Geholaspis hortorum (Berlese, 1918)
 Geholaspis ilvana Valle & Mazzoleni, 1967
 Geholaspis lagrecai Valle, 1963
 Geholaspis longisetosus Balogh, 1958
 Geholaspis longispinosus (Kramer, 1876)
 Geholaspis longulus (Berlese, 1887)
 Geholaspis mandibularis (Berlese, 1904)
 Geholaspis pauperior (Berlese, 1918)
 Geholaspis pennulatus
 Geholaspis ponticus Bregetova & Koroleva, 1960

References

Macrochelidae
Articles created by Qbugbot